Harry Foster (20 March 1898 – 1980) was an English footballer who played for Rochdale

References

Rochdale A.F.C. players
English footballers
1898 births
1980 deaths
Footballers from Rochdale
Association footballers not categorized by position